Peter Fraßmann (born 20 July 1958) is a retired German footballer.

Fraßmann made a total of 152 appearances in the 2. Bundesliga. After his playing career, Fraßmann studied osteopathy at the University of Westminster in London and has since opened his own clinic in Berlin-Charlottenburg which closed at the end of 2020 due to retirement.

References

External links 
 

1958 births
Living people
German footballers
Association football defenders
Association football midfielders
2. Bundesliga players
Borussia Dortmund players
SC Preußen Münster players
Tennis Borussia Berlin players
KSV Hessen Kassel players
Alumni of the University of Westminster
Place of birth missing (living people)